Al-Habbaniya Sport Club, is an Iraqi football team based in Al-Habbaniya, Al-Anbar, that plays in Iraq Division Two.

Managerial history
 Hadi Salih Al-Azzawy
 Yasser Salman
 Saad Nasser
 Qusay Khamis
 Shaker Mohammed Sabbar

See also 
 2021–22 Iraq FA Cup

References

External links
 Al-Habbaniya SC on Goalzz.com
 Iraq Clubs- Foundation Dates

1991 establishments in Iraq
Association football clubs established in 1991
Football clubs in Al-Anbar